The Addis Ababa Agreement was a settlement reached at the 1993 Conference on National Reconciliation in Somalia.

External links
Full text of the agreement

1993 in Somalia
History of Addis Ababa